U.S. Route 64 (US 64) is an east–west United States highway that runs for 2,326 miles (3,743 km) from Nags Head in eastern North Carolina to just southwest of the Four Corners in northeast Arizona. The western terminus is at U.S. Route 160 in Teec Nos Pos, Arizona. The highway's eastern terminus is at NC 12 and U.S. Route 158 at Whalebone Junction, North Carolina.

Route description

|-
|NM
|
|-
|OK
|
|-
|AR
|
|-
|TN
|
|-
|NC
|
|-
|Total
|
|}

Arizona
US 64's western terminus is Teec Nos Pos, Arizona, at US 160.

New Mexico

Within New Mexico, US 64 runs through Farmington, Taos, Angel Fire, Eagle Nest, Cimarron, and Raton. As it runs through Raton, it is co-signed with U.S. Route 87. It continues through to Clayton, where US 87 is replaced by U.S. Routes 56 and 412. The three routes then run concurrently into Oklahoma.

It is one of the roads on the Trails of the Ancients Byway, one of the designated New Mexico Scenic Byways.  At Angel Fire, US 64 runs past the Vietnam Veterans Memorial State Park.

Oklahoma

Heading into the Oklahoma Panhandle, the three conjoined routes pick up a fourth two miles (3 km) southwest of Boise City, as US-385 merges from the south.  In Boise City, US-385 departs to the north along with U.S. 287, which replaces US-385 in the four-way concurrency on the way out of town to the east, before departing itself to the southeast two miles (3 km) outside of town.  Shortly thereafter, US-56 also departs the route, heading northeast into Kansas, while US-64 and US-412 continue their journey due east toward Guymon.

Near Guymon, the route turns due south to approach the town. US-412 then heads due east, while US-64 veers from due south to northeast, joining up with US-54. At Turpin, US-64 turns left, running north with US-83; three miles (5 km) later, it again turns east, joining US-270 while US-83 and westbound US-270 continue north to Liberal, Kansas.   to the east, US-270 departs to the south, and US-64 finally runs solo for a significant stretch save for very short concurrencies with US-283 near Rosston, US-183 through Buffalo, and US-281 in Alva.

Near Pond Creek, US-64 turns south, joined by US-60 and US-81. US-64 splits off just north of Enid, jogging through the city before rejoining US-412 on the east side of town.  The two routes remain together until they meet Interstate 35, which US-64 joins briefly southbound while US-412 continues east, becoming the Cimarron Turnpike.  US-64 departs I-35 at Perry, intersecting the parallel US-77 before continuing east.

On either side of Morrison the route intersects US-177 and US-412 (again) before passing through Pawnee and Cleveland.  It then veers southeast, rejoining US-412 yet again to head into Tulsa.

In downtown Tulsa, the route diverges from US-412 for the final time.  It briefly (and separately) is concurrent with Interstate 244 and US-75 before bearing southeast through the city while joining OK-51 , intersecting Interstate 44 before briefly joining the southernmost five miles (8 km) of US-169, disjoining OK-51 running southbound on the eastern edge of the city.  It then proceeds south, crossing the Creek Turnpike, then crosses the Arkansas River in Bixby before turning to the southeast.

After passing through Haskell, US-64 and US-62 meet head-on, north–south; they join and head east toward Muskogee.  The routes disengage at the intersection with US-69, with US-64 bearing south out of the center of town.  At Warner, the route turns eastward again, where it will run parallel to Interstate 40 for the remainder of its path through Oklahoma.  It passes through Webbers Falls, Gore, Vian, Sallisaw (where it has a brief concurrence with US-59), Muldrow, and Roland before leaving the state.

Arkansas

The route enters Arkansas in Fort Smith and crosses the Arkansas River. The route continues following Interstate 40 through Clarksville, Russellville, and Conway, where I-40 turns south and US 64 continues east. US 64 runs with US 67 and US 167 (Future Interstate 57) near Searcy before passing through rural Eastern Arkansas fields.  US 64 runs east to Marion and West Memphis, where it meets I-40 and Interstate 55 to continue east over the Mississippi River on the Memphis & Arkansas Bridge to Memphis, Tennessee. A segment of US 64 in Crittenden County is also known as Military Road and is the oldest road in the state. It was surveyed for the removal of Native Tribes known of as the Trail of Tears. A historical marker in Marion notes this information.

Tennessee

US 64 enters Tennessee on the Memphis-Arkansas Bridge at Memphis.  The route shares the bridge with Interstate 55 and U.S. Routes 61, 70, and 79. The route traverses several streets in Memphis before becoming a rural divided highway in eastern Shelby County.  The highway runs directly to the east through the county seats of Tennessee's most southern counties. US 64 then continues on past Lawrenceburg, the largest city on the Alabama state line between Memphis and Interstate 65, to Chattanooga. Then US 64 runs from Chattanooga to Cleveland, where it duplexes with US 74 to the North Carolina state line. The Tennessee Department of Transportation is currently working to expand the highway to four lanes across the state.  The easternmost portion of the highway in Tennessee is the Ocoee Scenic Byway, a winding, two-lane road through the Ocoee River gorge in Polk County. The steep terrain around the highway is subject to landslides, such as the massive slide in November 2009 that closed the highway for several months.

North Carolina

US 64 enters North Carolina in Cherokee County, west of Murphy. The highway serves the cities of Brevard, Hendersonville, Rutherfordton, Lenoir, Statesville, Lexington, Asheboro, Siler City, Cary, Raleigh, Rocky Mount, Tarboro, Williamston, and Manteo.

The segment from Franklin to Highlands is a mountainous two-lane road limited to moderate-sized trucks. Large trucks are routed via Truck US 64 (US 23/441 and US 74) to Sylva, and Asheville.

Interstate 40 travels through Statesville on a route originally designed in 1950 as a bypass of US 64, intersecting with Interstate 77 at what was once intended to be a bypass of US 21.

Within the Raleigh city limits, US 64 follows the southern section of the Beltline. In 2006 a major section known as the Knightdale Bypass opened to ease traffic. After it was completed, US 64 became a divided freeway between Cary and Williamston, and carried at least four lanes between Asheboro and Columbia.

US 64 serves as a gateway to the Outer Banks, ending at Nags Head where it meets U.S. Route 158 and NC 12.

US 64 extends a total of 563 miles (906 km) from the state's western border to the Outer Banks. from the western edge of the state to the Outer Banks.  It is the longest highway in North Carolina; a common way to express coverage of the entire state is to say, "from Murphy to Manteo".  US 64 runs through both.

History

U.S. Route 485 (US 485) was commissioned in 1926, looping west of US 85 between Santa Fe and Raton, New Mexico. In 1931, it became an extension of US 64. In 1959, the Arizona Department of Transportation submitted a proposal to extend US 64 west from Santa Fe, New Mexico to US 89 near Tuba City, Arizona, which was rejected. The portion south of Taos was removed in 1974, when US 64 was realigned and extended to Farmington, and became NM 68.

Major intersections

Arizona
  in Teec Nos Pos
New Mexico
  in Shiprock. The highways travel concurrently through Shiprock.
  in Bloomfield. The highways travel concurrently through Bloomfield.
  east of Monero. The highways travel concurrently to south-southwest of Tierra Amarilla.
  in Tres Piedras
  south of Raton. The highways travel concurrently to Raton.
  in Raton. US 64/US 87 travels concurrently to Clayton.
  in Clayton. US 56/US 64 travels concurrently to east-northeast of Boise City, Oklahoma. US 64/US 412 travels concurrently to Guymon.
Oklahoma
  southwest of Boise City. The highways travel concurrently to Boise City.
  east of Boise City
  in Guymon. The highways travel concurrently to Hooker.
  in Turpin. The highways travel concurrently to north of Turpin.
  north of Turpin. US 64/US 270 travel concurrently to Forgan.
  northwest of Rosston. The highways travel concurrently to east of Rosston.
  in Buffalo. The highways travel concurrently to north-northeast of Buffalo.
  in Alva. The highways travel concurrently through the city.
  west of Pond Creek. The highways travel concurrently to the Enid–North Enid city line.
  in Enid. The highways travel concurrently to north-northwest of Perry.
  north-northwest of Perry. I-35/US 64 travels concurrently to Perry.
  in Perry. The highways travel concurrently through Perry.
  west-southwest of Morrison
  east of Morrison
  in Westport. The highways travel concurrently to Tulsa.
  in Tulsa. The highways travel concurrently through Tulsa.
  in Tulsa. I-444 and US 64 have a hidden concurrency through Tulsa.
  in Tulsa
  in Tulsa. The highways travel concurrently through Tulsa.
  north-northeast of Boynton. The highways travel concurrently to Muskogee.
  in Muskogee. The highways travel concurrently through Muskogee.
  in Warner
  in Sallisaw. The highways travel concurrently through Sallisaw.
  in Sallisaw
  south-southwest of Roland
Arkansas
  in Van Buren
  in Clarksville
  in Lamar
  in London
  in Conway
  in Beebe. The highways travel concurrently to Bald Knob.
  in Fair Oaks
  in Marion. I-55/US 61/US 64 travels concurrently to Memphis, Tennessee. US 63/US 64 travels concurrently to West Memphis.
  in West Memphis. I-40/US 64 travels concurrently through West Memphis. US 64/US 79 travels concurrently to the Memphis–Bartlett, Tennessee city line.
  in West Memphis. The highways travel concurrently to the Memphis–Bartlett, Tennessee city line.
Tennessee
  in Memphis
  in Memphis. The highways travel concurrently through Memphis.
  in Memphis
  in Memphis
  in Memphis
  on the Memphis–Bartlett city line
  in Eads
  in Selmer. The highways travel concurrently through Selmer.
  in Lawrenceburg
  in Pulaski
  west of Frankewing
  in Fayetteville. US 64/US 231 travels concurrently through Fayetteville.
  in Winchester
  southwest of Pelham. The highways travel concurrently to Kimball.
  in Kimball. US 64/US 72 travels concurrently to Chattanooga.
  in Jasper. The highways travel concurrently to Chattanooga.
  in Chattanooga
  in Chattanooga. The highways travel concurrently to Cleveland.
  in Chattanooga
  in Chattanooga
  in Chattanooga. The highways travel concurrently through Chattanooga.
  in Chattanooga. The highways travel concurrently to north of Collegedale.
  in East Cleveland. The highways travel concurrently to Murphy, North Carolina.
  in Ocoee
North Carolina
  southwest of Murphy. The highways travel concurrently to Murphy.
  in Franklin. The highways travel concurrently to southeast of Franklin.
  northwest of Rosman
  in Brevard. The highways travel concurrently through Brevard.
  in Hendersonville
  in Rutherfordton
  in Morganton
  in Morganton. The highways travel concurrently through Morganton.
  in Lenoir
  in Statesville
  in Statesville
  in Statesville. The highways travel concurrently through Statesville.
  in Statesville
  east-northeast of Statesville
  west-northwest of Mocksville
  in Mocksville. The highways travel concurrently through Mocksville.
  in Mocksville
  in Lexington
  in Lexington. The highways travel concurrently through Lexington.
  east-southeast of Lexington
  in Asheboro
  in Siler City
  north of Pittsboro
  in Apex
  in Cary. The highways travel concurrently to Raleigh.
  in Raleigh. I-40/US 64 travels concurrently through Raleigh.
  in Raleigh
  in Raleigh. I-440/US 64 travels concurrently through Raleigh.
  in Raleigh. I-87/US 64 travels concurrently to Knightdale. US 64/US 264 travels concurrently to Zebulon.
  in Rocky Mount
  in Rocky Mount
  in Tarboro. The highways travel concurrently to Princeville.
  north of Bethel. The highways travel concurrently to Williamston.
  south of Williamston.
  southwest of Manns Harbor
  in Nags Head

Special routes

Alternate routes
 US 64A - Franklinville to Ramseur, North Carolina (former)
 US 64A - Brevard, North Carolina (former)
 US 64A - Bat Cave to Morganton, North Carolina (former)
 US 64A - Statesville, North Carolina (former)
 US 64A - Siler City, North Carolina (former)
 ALT US 64 - Spring Hope to Nashville, North Carolina
 US 64A - Rocky Mount, North Carolina (former)
 ALT US 64 - Rocky Mount to Tarboro, North Carolina
 ALT US 64 - Princeville to Williamston, North Carolina
 US 64A - Williamston, North Carolina (former)
 US 64A - Columbia, North Carolina (former)

Business routes
There are several sections of Business US 64 serving more as alternate routes of the main highway. While they go through towns and cities, they often run numerous miles through rural areas and often pass through more than one city.

 BUS US 64 - Farmington, New Mexico
 US-64 Bus. - Enid, Oklahoma (former)
 US-64 Bus. - Muskogee, Oklahoma
 US 64B - Alma, Arkansas
 US 64B - Vilonia, Arkansas
 US 64C - Beebe, Arkansas (former)
 US 64B - Augusta, Arkansas
 US 64B - Patterson to McCrory, Arkansas
 US 64B - Wynne, Arkansas
 US 64B - Parkin, Arkansas
 US 64B - Earle, Arkansas
 US 64B - Crawfordsville, Arkansas
 BUS US 64 - Whiteville, Tennessee
 BUS US 64 - Selmer, Tennessee
 BUS US 64 - Fayetteville, Tennessee
 BUS US 64 - Winchester, Tennessee
 BUS US 64 - Hayesville, North Carolina
 BUS US 64 (1960–1980) - Brevard, North Carolina (former)
 BUS US 64 (2006–present) - Brevard, North Carolina
 BUS US 64 - Morganton, North Carolina
 BUS US 64 - Statesville, North Carolina (former)
 BUS US 64 - Asheboro, North Carolina
 BUS US 64 - Pittsboro, North Carolina
 BUS US 64 - Raleigh to Zebulon, North Carolina
 BUS US 64 - Nashville, North Carolina
 BUS US 64 - Rocky Mount, North Carolina
 BUS US 64 - Tarboro to Princeville, North Carolina (former)
 BUS US 64 - Williamston, North Carolina (former)
 BUS US 64 - Jamesville, North Carolina
 BUS US 64 - Columbia, North Carolina

Bypass routes
 APD-40 - Cleveland, Tennessee
 BYP US 64 - Morganton, North Carolina
 US 64 Byp. - Manns Harbor to Manteo, North Carolina

Spur routes
 US 64S - Wynne, Arkansas

Truck routes
 TRUCK US 64 - Franklin, North Carolina to Hendersonville, North Carolina

Photo gallery

See also

Related routes
 U.S. Route 164 (former)
 U.S. Route 264

References

External links

 Endpoints of U.S. Highway 64

 
United States Numbered Highway System
U.S. Highways in Arizona